Zuidzijde is a village in the Dutch province of South Holland. It is a part of the municipality of Bodegraven-Reeuwijk, and lies about 7 km west of Woerden.

The statistical area "Zuidzijde", which also can include the surrounding countryside, has a population of around 240.

References

Populated places in South Holland